Cinisi is a town and a comune in the Metropolitan City of Palermo in Sicily. As of 1 January 2022 it has a population of 11.846.

Geography
The town is part of the Palermo metropolitan area, borders with the municipalities of Carini and Terrasini and count the civil parish (frazione) of Punta Raisi, seat of Palermo Airport.

Climate

Culture
Cinisi is famous, among other things, for the Carnivale parade with many papier-mâché floats. These floats are created every year by a group of young residents who come together and brainstorm their ideas. Carnivale in Cinisi every year has a different theme and the community is to go along with it. Teenagers creating the float are provided with money by the community and come together to develop ideas on what they can create to make their festival an enjoyable and attractive one for the community; however, multiple floats are created and requires multiple groups with different creative skills in order to compete. Therefore, the town allows students to create their floats and on the day of Carnivale the floats are put in a contest as to which one was created "the best". The group who creates the most appealing float is then rewarded with cash money and split between the volunteers. Other than the floats, Carnivale in Cinisi like any other Carnivale festival comparing to Halloween celebrations in the United States. Although, in Cinisi Carnivale is held on "Corso Umberto I". The street is filled with everyone all over town and even families from neighboring towns. The streets are filled with entertainment from moving Dj floats to dancing performances. The three day Carnivale is prepared for throughout the year where participants come together and practice performances for the upcoming festival.

Giuseppe Impastato
Famous anti-mafia activist Giuseppe Impastato was assassinated in Cinisi by the Mafia in 1978. Today, his boyhood home can be found on the main street of Cinisi, Corso Umberto I, and is open to tourists. The house displays evidence and tells the interesting and significant story of Impastato, or "Peppino", as some knew him, in his final years as he fought the Mafia. Cinisi also has landmarks and places related to Impastato's life that attract many school groups and writers.

Demographics
Note: 2007 estimation by The World Gazetteer.

Transport
The Falcone-Borsellino Airport of Palermo, also known as Punta Raisi, is located in its municipal territory. Cinisi counts a pair of train stations (Cinisi-Terrasini on the Palermo-Trapani line and Punta Raisi, served by the Palermo metropolitan railway service) and is served by the A29 motorway.

Personalities
Giovanni Meli (1740–1815), Sicilian poet.
Gaetano Badalamenti (1923–2004), leading Mafia figure held responsible for the murder of Giuseppe Impastato.
Giuseppe Impastato (1948–1978), political activist against the Mafia. The 2000 film I cento passi, dedicated to him, was filmed in Cinisi.

References

External links

Municipalities of the Metropolitan City of Palermo